Ultar Sar (also Ultar, Ultar II, Bojohagur Duanasir II) is the 
southeasternmost major peak of the Batura Muztagh, a subrange of the Karakoram range.


Notable features and climbing history

While not one of the highest peaks of the Karakoram, Ultar Sar is notable for its dramatic rise above local terrain. Combined with its strategic position at the end of the Batura Muztagh, with the Hunza River bending around it, this makes Ultar a visually striking peak.

Ultar Sar also gained fame in the 1990s as supposedly the world's highest unclimbed independent peak. This was incorrect, as Gangkhar Puensum in Bhutan is higher, and remains unclimbed (and off-limits) as of 2007 (two other higher peaks are also reputedly unclimbed and of independent stature). However, that perception did add to the appeal of the peak, and a number of expeditions attempted to climb it. During the 1980s and 1990s fifteen expeditions made attempts and no summits, but with a number of fatalities.

The first two summits were made in 1996 by two separate Japanese expeditions, the first on 11 July from the Tokai section of the Japanese Alpine Club led by Akito Yamazaki, and the second led by Ken Takahashi. The first summit team comprised Yamazaki and Kiyoshi Matsuoka (who died one year later on the nearby peak Bublimotin). They climbed the peak from the southwest in alpine style, doing much of the climbing at night to avoid danger from falling rock and ice. After their summit, they faced strong storms and bivouacked several days without food before returning to basecamp. Yamazaki died of an internal disease after the descent to basecamp. The second summit was made on 31 July via the south ridge by Takahashi, Masayuki Ando, Ryushi Hoshino, Wataru Saito, and Nobuo Tsutsumi. Third ascent of the peak was also made from the south west by Daniel Akbar a British Born Pakistani climber. Daniel climbed the peak solo in Alpine Style using some of the old fixed ropes from the earlier expedition.

Bruce Normand and Timothy Miller from UK successfully rescued alive while their companion Christian Huber from Austria had succumbed to avalanche.

Nearby summits and glaciers

Ultar Sar is the east end of a short, somewhat level ridge, the west end of which is a peak called Bojahagur Duanasir (7,329 m/24,045 ft), climbed in 1984 by a Japanese party. To the northwest of both peaks is the huge pyramid of Shispare (7,611 m/24,970 ft). Along the southwest ridge of the massif are Hunza Peak and the striking rock spire of Bublimotin (Ladyfinger Peak).
The glaciers draining the slopes of the massif are (clockwise from north): the Ghulkin Glacier, the Gulmit Glacier, the Ahmad Abad Glacier, the Ultar Glacier, and the Hasanabad Glacier (many of these have other names as well).

See also
 Hunza
 List of Mountains in Pakistan
 Highest Mountains of the World

References

Sources
 Jerzy Wala, Orographical Sketch Map of the Karakoram, Swiss Foundation for Alpine Research, 1990.
 Jerzy Wala, Orographical Sketch Map of the Batura Muztagh, 1988.
 American Alpine Journal, 1997.
 Himalayan Index
 Kashmir#Terminology

External links
 Travel.web.pk, Ultar Peak Page
 HunzaGuidesPakistan.com, Ultar Peak Page
 Adventure Trip Report by Kuan Sng
 First Ultar II Ascent and Tragedy, 1996

Mountains of Gilgit-Baltistan
Seven-thousanders of the Karakoram